The 1921 Creighton Blue and White football team was an American football team that represented Creighton University as an independent during the 1921 college football season. In its first season under head coach Howard M. Baldrige, the team compiled an 8–1 record and outscored opponents by a total of 146 to 34. The team played its home games in Omaha, Nebraska.

Schedule

References

Creighton
Creighton Bluejays football seasons
Creighton Blue and White football